Tilalyan (Arabic: تلالين Tlālayn) also known as Til Alyan is a village in northern Aleppo Governorate, northwestern Syria. The village lies just outside of the town of Mare'.

The village has a population of 7,200 people, of which Arabs comprise 83,5% and Kurds 16,5%.
The village has seen sustained fighting in the Syrian civil war and was taken by the Free Syrian Army on 16 October 2016.

The village is roughly square in shape, 500 m by 500m and has a mosque.

References

Towns in Aleppo Governorate